David Rivkin (born 1953), professionally known as David Z, is an American music producer, engineer, and songwriter from Minneapolis, Minnesota. He is best known for his long-standing work with Prince, and has contributed to albums by Etta James, Billy Idol, BoDeans, Buddy Guy and Neneh Cherry.

Rivkin was a member of Lipps Inc, with whom he had a US #1 and UK #2 hit with "Funkytown" (1979). He also produced Fine Young Cannibals' "She Drives Me Crazy" (1988), creating the song's signature snare drum sound. As of 2021, Rivkin is based in Los Angeles, California.

Personal life
David is the eldest of three brothers, each of whom work in media entertainment.  His youngest brother Bobby Z. was the original drummer in Prince's band The Revolution whilst his middle brother Stephen E. Rivkin is notable for his work as a film editor, particularly as editor of the Pirates Of The Caribbean trilogy of films and Avatar.

Early work
After spending much of his teenage years in a variety of local rock'n'roll bands around Minneapolis, Z spent time between Minneapolis and Los Angeles throughout the early 1970s songwriting and engineering.  His early work is perhaps most known over this period in his writing contributions for Gram Parsons' first solo LP GP, particularly the track 'How Much I've Lied', before going on to play a major role in establishing not only the Minneapolis sound but through his innovative use of drum machines, loops and samples much of production aesthetic now synonymous with music from the 1980s.  Many collaborations of material was produced by David at Paisley Park throughout the late 1980s and 1990s.

Prince
During the mid-1970s, David encountered Prince playing around the Minneapolis scene. The pair went on to record a set of demos with Z engineering which ultimately led to Prince signing a recording deal with Warner Bros. Records. Although much of the detail of Z's exact contributions to Prince's albums is lost in the myth surrounding Prince and his prolific writing and recording, it is clear that his input, recording technique and production are intertwined intrinsically into those recordings. His most well documented contributions to Prince's folio of work are his writing, production and engineering on 1986 hit "Kiss" - originally a song given to the band Mazarati by Prince for their debut album which Z was producing - and his recording and engineering of Purple Rain.

Soundtrack work
Z continues to work successfully in the field of film soundtracks and scoring. Aside from his early work with Prince on Purple Rain and Under The Cherry Moon, Z's work can be heard on the 1996 John Travolta film Michael directed by Nora Ephron, where he produced songs by Al Green and Kenny Wayne Shepherd. His songs with Tevin Campbell "Stand Out" and "I 2 I" are featured in Disney's film A Goofy Movie.

References

Living people
1950s births
Musicians from Minneapolis
Record producers from Minnesota